Sunday Funday is a Sunday teen variety show that is aired on TV5. The show premiered on April 8, 2012 and aired every Sunday afternoon in the Philippines. It aired its last episode on June 10, 2012. It was replaced by Game 'N Go on June 17, 2012.

Hosts
 Joshua Davis
 BJ Forbes
 AJ Muhlach
 Aki Torio
 John Uy
 Christian Samson
 Rico dela Paz
 Meg Imperial
 Nadine Lustre
 Shy Carlos

See also
TV5
List of programs aired by The 5 Network

References

External links
 

Philippine variety television shows
2012 Philippine television series debuts
2012 Philippine television series endings
TV5 (Philippine TV network) original programming
Filipino-language television shows